was a railway station on the "Hanasaki Line" section of the JR Hokkaido Nemuro Main Line. Located in Akkeshi, Akkeshi District, Kushiro Subprefecture, Hokkaidō, Japan, it opened at Nov. 25, 1919, and closed on Mar. 12, 2022.

References

Railway stations in Hokkaido Prefecture
Stations of Hokkaido Railway Company
Akkeshi, Hokkaido
Railway stations in Japan opened in 1919
Railway stations closed in 2022